Ahmed Ali Ahmed is a former leader of al-Qaeda in Iraq. It was reported on May 18, 2008 he was sentenced to death by an Iraqi court for killing Archbishop Paulos Faraj Rahho, an Assyrian Christian archbishop in the Chaldean Catholic Church. 
Rahho was kidnapped in February 2008 and held for several demands, including that Assyrian Christians pay jizya and attack U.S. forces militarily. 
Ahmed was sentenced to death at Iraqi Central Criminal Court on May 18, 2008.

Ahmed is also known as Abu Omar.

References

Members of al-Qaeda in Iraq
Year of birth missing (living people)
Living people
People imprisoned on charges of terrorism
Iraqi prisoners sentenced to death
Prisoners sentenced to death by Iraq
Iraqi people convicted of murder
People convicted of murder by Iraq